Blood Revolt are a black metal band featuring A.A. Nemtheanga of Primordial along with J. Read and Vermin, who previously played together in Axis of Advance and Revenge.  Described as "intensely militaristic",  Blood Revolt attracted controversy with its 2010 debut, Blood Revolt, due to lyrical content that assumed the perspective of a suicide bomber.  Nemtheanga explained that the violence of the lyrics was based in realistic subject matter rather than "cartoon imagery or fantastical pseudo religious hocus pocus".  For Nemtheanga, the subject matter is more effective owing to its realism:

The concept of Indoctrine describes "a man's descent from alienation to martyrdom in eight chapters through religious indoctrination, madness, to bomb making, serial killing and ultimately revenge. It could be set anywhere throughout this world; all you need to do is turn on the news and you can see the inspiration".

While some have interpreted the lyrics as cautioning against religious fanaticism, A.A. Nemtheanga clarified that this was incorrect: "There's absolutely no caution whatsoever, in fact if anything, it praises the dedication and sacrifice of the character. The album doesn't judge, that’s not the point".

Members
 A.A. Nemtheanga – vocals
 James Read – drums
 Chris Ross (aka Vermin) – guitars

Discography
 Indoctrine (Profound Lore, 2010)

References

Irish black metal musical groups
Musical groups established in 2010
2010 establishments in Ireland